Sutter National Wildlife Refuge, the southernmost refuge in the Sacramento National Wildlife Refuge Complex, is located in the Sacramento Valley of California, about  north of the metropolitan area of Sacramento.

Sutter Refuge typically supports wintering populations of more than 175,000 ducks and 50,000 geese.

The mixed riparian forest habitat on the refuge is important for breeding and migrating passerine birds, and supports a large heron/egret rookery. The refuge provides habitat for several Federal and State endangered and threatened species, including giant garter snake, winter-run Chinook salmon, yellow-billed cuckoo, and Swainson's hawk.

References
Refuge profile
Refuge website

National Wildlife Refuges in California
Wetlands of California
Grasslands of California
Protected areas of Sutter County, California
Landforms of Sutter County, California